= NGC 7834 =

Spiral galaxy in the constellation Pisces

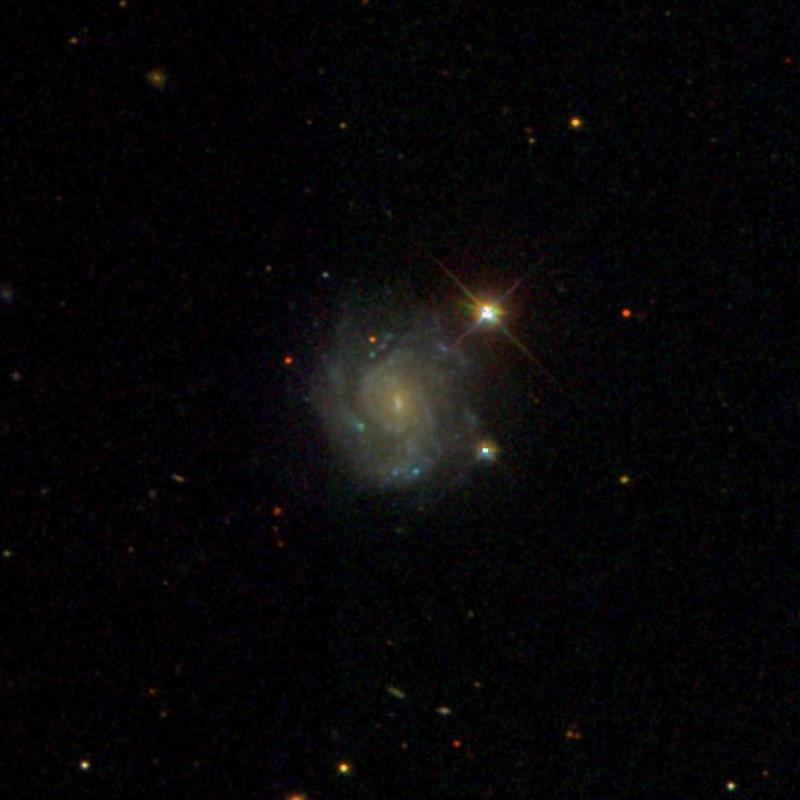

Observation data (J2000 epoch)
- Constellation: Pisces
- Right ascension: 00^{h} 06^{m} 37.86^{s}
- Declination: +08° 22′ 04.14″
- Redshift: 0.017449
- Heliocentric radial velocity: 5,231 ± 1
- Distance: 234 Mly

Characteristics
- Type: Scd
- Size: ~101,000 ly (30.9 kpc) (estimated)

Other designations
- PGC 504, UGC 49, CGCG 408-030, MCG +01-01-030

NGC 7834 is a spiral galaxy located in the constellation Pisces. The redshift of the galaxy is estimated to be at (z) 0.017.

== Supernova ==
One supernova has been observed in NGC 7834: SN 2024vvs (Type IIb, mag. 19.2738) was discovered by the Automatic Learning for the Rapid Classification of Events (ALeRCE) on 22 September 2024.
